Lake Clifton Eastern High School (LCEHS) was a public high school closed in 2003, located in the Clifton Park area of northeast Baltimore, Maryland. Originally called Lake Clifton High School (LCHS), although it was commonly known as Lake High School or Lake Clifton, it is now called the Lake Clifton Campus (LCC).

Along with Walbrook and Southwestern High Schools, LCHS was constructed in 1970-71, and opened in September 1971, named after the Lake Clifton Reservoir and the Clifton Park neighborhood where it was located.  Designed during the post-World War II "Baby Boom" years of the 1960s to relieve overcrowding in the city's public high schools, particularly nearby Baltimore City College (City HS), the third oldest public high school in America (founded 1839), and Eastern High School (EHS).  Each had about 4,000 students, twice their maximum capacity.

In 1986, with the closure of EHS, the two schools merged and LCHS was renamed Lake Clifton Eastern High School. However after the 2002–03 school year, LCEHS was also closed due to declining school enrollment.  Two smaller secondary schools, Heritage High School and the REACH! Partnership School subsequently used the campus. In August 2020, the city announced that it planned to sell the property for potential redevelopment, possibly to Morgan State University.

History

Early years
A reservoir named "Lake Clifton Reservoir" occupied the site and was in use until the late 1960s.  The reservoir was drained and became the site for the high school's construction in 1970–71.  Originally known as "Lake Clifton High School".  At the time it was constructed, the school's property area of 441.11 acres (178.51 ha)  made it the largest physical plant high school on the East Coast of the United States.  In Lake Clifton's 2002 yearbook, it states that LCEHS "was [in the early 70s], and perhaps remains, the largest physical plant high school in the nation." The cost of constructing and equipping LCHS was approximately $17 million in 1970, which adjusting for inflation, would be approximately $99,258,764.27 in 2010.  The school was designed to hold 4,800 students.

In the 1985–86 school year, Eastern High School merged with Lake Clifton High School, and the Baltimore City School Board changed the school's name to reflect this. In 1995, the school became a pilot high school for the Sylvan Learning Center, reconfiguring its curriculum as a result.  From 1995 to 2003, Lake Clifton Eastern consisted of six smaller learning communities:  the School of the Academy of Finance and Law (formerly known as "The Academy of Finance and Law"); the School of Business and Commerce; the School of Human Services; the School of Communications and Technology; the School of Humanities and Fine and Cultural Arts; and the Ninth Grade Achievement School.  The goal and mission of Lake Clifton Eastern High School was "to provide an educational program relevant to the needs of all students to prepare them for college/post secondary education, or the world of work."

On Sunday, January 30, 1995, an electrical fire caused by faulty wiring destroyed the school's original two story library, cafeteria, and administrative offices. In 1998, a one-story state-of-the-art media center and library was built to replace the fire-damaged section, at the cost of $4 million, which would be $5,344,512.24 adjusted for inflation in 2010.

21st century

Following an ill-timed attempt to close the school during the middle of the 2001–2002 academic year, the city school board decided to downsize LCEHS into a smaller school after the graduation of the Class of 2003.  With support from the Small Schools Workshop, school faculty members and administrators met and planned new, small, learning communities to open within Lake Clifton. However, the board changed plans and decided on new uses for the campus, dividing the school population to other schools. As a result, in 2003, Lake Clifton Eastern High School ceased to exist, its campus converting into two separate, smaller schools: Heritage High School and Doris M. Johnson High School.  A third school, City Springs Elementary/Middle Alternative Charter School was temporarily on the campus before moving to the Belair-Edison neighborhood. The Lake Clifton Campus was then occupied by the Heritage High School and the REACH! Partnership School, which moved onto the campus in 2007, and expanded after the closure of the Doris M. Johnson High School in 2011. Faced with continuing population decline and shrinking school enrollment, the city announced plans in August 2020, to sell the property for potential redevelopment, possibly to Morgan State University.

Crime

Discipline problems, high dropout rates, violence, low test scores and low attendance had plagued the school for decades. Shooting incidents occurred on the campus in 1984, 1985, 1986 and a fatal shooting resulting in the death of a high school student occurred on January 17, 2001.

Extracurricular activities

Athletics
From 1971 through the early 1990s, there were several sports such as tennis, badminton and swimming & diving, all of which were terminated. During the 2002–03 school year, the last year of the school's existence, Lake Clifton only had 7 athletic activities. The athletic teams won several state and/or city championships:

Swimming — State championship: 1993
Tennis — State championship: 1991, 1992
Football — State championship: 1990, 1999
Boys' basketball — Baltimore City (District 9): 1993, 2003; State championship: 1995, 2003

Layout and site

Building layout
The building has a central core containing main offices, a 1,000-seat auditorium, two cafeterias, two gymnasiums, a swimming pool, main library & media center, and other administrative offices.  This core is connected by bridges and passageways to two buildings, each containing a common area radiating to two distinct smaller units housing classrooms on four levels.  The units are referred to as A, B, C, and D units; A and B units are connected on the left side of the central core and C and D units on the right side. After the closure of LCEHS, as of 2010, Heritage High School utilizes the A & B unit side, and the REACH! Partnership School utilizes the C & D side of the campus (formerly used by Doris M. Johnson High School).

Outside area

The Lake Clifton Campus includes an athletic sports field, a track and field area, and a tennis area which can also be used for badminton.  Additionally, there is a 6-acre (2.4 ha) sustainable agriculture urban farm, "Real Food Farm", which is managed by Civic Works, Inc.  The farm has several "hoop houses", tunnel-greenhouses, that were created in 2009 in order to increase food access in local neighborhoods, as well as demonstrating the economic potential of agriculture and environmental urban farming and providing educational opportunities.

Notable alumni
 Will Barton – NBA player
 Thomas Jordan – NBA player
 Shawnta Rogers – professional basketball player
 Josh Selby – NBA player
Michael Antonio "Mike" King – Professional European Basketball Player

See also
 Clifton Park Valve House

Notes

References

External links
Heritage High School website
REACH! Partnership School website
Civic Works, Inc
Real Food Farm

Educational institutions established in 1971
Educational institutions in the United States with year of establishment missing
Public high schools in Maryland
Public schools in Baltimore
Defunct schools in Maryland